Mousavi  is a surname.  It is also spelled Moosavi, Moussaoui, Moussavi and Moussawi. The word is an adjective in Arabic which means descendants of Musa. Notable people with the name include:

Politics
 Abbas al-Musawi (c.1952–1992), Lebanese Muslim cleric and leader of Hezbollah
 Abdolrahim Mousavi, Iranian general
 Agha Syed Hamid Ali Shah Moosavi Leader of TNFJ, Pakistan
 Fakhraddin Mousavi (born 1930), Iranian judge and politician
 Farid Mousavi, Iranian politician
 Mir-Hossein Mousavi (born 1942), Iranian politician
 Mohammad Vaez Mousavi (born 1964), Iranian cleric and politician
 Ruhollah Mousavi Khomeini (1902—1989), Iranian politician who came to power after the 1979 Iranian revolution.
 Seyed Mohsen Mousavi, Iranian diplomat
 Salam Adil, Iraqi communist politician

Sport
 Ahmad Mousavi (born 1992), Iranian football player
 Ali Mousavi (born 1976), Iranian football player
 Alireza Mousavi (born 1990), Iranian handball player
 Danial Mousavi (born 1997), Iranian football player
 Hussain Al-Moussawi (born 1988), Kuwaiti football player
 Iman Mousavi (born 1989), Iranian footballer
 Kaveh Mousavi (born 1985), Iranian athlete
 Mohammad Mousavi (born 1987), Iranian volleyball player
 Seyed Ayoub Mousavi (born 1995), Iranian weightlifter

Other people
 Farshid Moussavi (born 1965), Iranian-born British architect
 Granaz Moussavi (born 1946), Iranian-born Australian poet, film director and screenwriter
 Ibrahim Mousawi (born 1965), Lebanese journalist
 Hamid Hussain Musavi (born 1830), Indian scholar
 Jamaluddin Mousavi (born 1976), Afghan TV presenter
 Muhammad Quli Musavi (born 1775), Indian scholar
 Mohammad Mofti-ol-shia Mousavi (1928–2010), Iranian Twelver Shi'a Marja
 Seyed Ali Mousavi, nephew of Mir-Hossein Mousavi who was killed during the 2009 Iranian election protests
 Syed Askar Mousavi (born 1956), Afghan author

See also
Al-Musawi
Musavi (name)
Rana Mousabi
Zacarias Moussaoui

Hashemite people